Matter of Fact or A Matter of Fact may refer to:

"A Matter of Fact", a short story by Rudyard Kipling
A Matter of Fact (album), album by American band Facts of Life
Matter of Fact with Soledad O'Brien, a weekly TV show hosted by Soledad O'Brien
Matter of Fact with Stan Grant, a nightly Australian TV and radio show on the ABC hosted by Stan Grant